Embry Riddle has a large pool of alumni ranging from high military officials, politicians, airline business leaders, intelligence agency officials, and White House advisors, along with six NASA astronauts and one Canadian Space Agency astronaut. Embry–Riddle Aeronautical University is the only accredited aviation-oriented university in the world. The university offers bachelor's and master's degrees at two residential campuses and through Embry–Riddle Worldwide. Associate degrees and non-degree programs are also offered by Embry–Riddle Worldwide.

Alumni

References

 
Embry-Riddle Aeronautical University alumni
Embry-Riddle Aeronautical University alumni